Maxine Koran Klibingaitis (born 17 May 1964) is an Australian actress. 

Maxine was born in Ballarat, Victoria and was married to the Australian television director, Andrew Friedman, they have one son, Zane Friedman. 

She is probably best known locally and internationally for her role as teen punk Bobbie Mitchell in the cult TV series Prisoner and as Terry Inglis, in Neighbours

In 2007 she won the MUFF award for Best Supporting Female Actor for her role as an unhinged, diabetic punk woman in the film Moonlight & Magic. Maxine appears in the first two Boronia Boys films, Boronia Boys and Boronia Backpackers, as local girl Caz.

Filmography

References

External links
 

1964 births
Living people
Australian people of Lithuanian descent
Australian film actresses
Australian soap opera actresses
People from Ballarat
20th-century Australian actresses
21st-century Australian actresses